Three Graces is a public art work by artist Heinz Mack located at the Lynden Sculpture Garden near Milwaukee, Wisconsin, United States. The three pillars are named Thalia, Aglaia and Euphrosyne; they are attached to a base and installed on the lawn.

References

Outdoor sculptures in Milwaukee
Buildings and structures completed in 1965
Steel sculptures in Wisconsin